Mouritala Ogunbiyi (born 10 October 1982) is a professional footballer who plays as a midfielder for Dragons. Born in Nigeria, he represents the Benin national team internationally.

Career
Ogunbiyi was part of the Benin national team's 2004 African Nations Cup team, which finished bottom of its group in the first round of competition, thus failing to secure qualification for the quarter-finals.

Whilst at Guingamp, then in Ligue 2, Ogunbiyi played as a substitute in the 2009 Coupe de France Final in which they beat Rennes.

On 23 February 2019, he re-joined AS Dragons FC de l'Ouémé.

References

External links

1982 births
Living people
Yoruba sportspeople
Citizens of Benin through descent
Nigerian people of Beninese descent
Beninese footballers
Association football forwards
Benin international footballers
2004 African Cup of Nations players
2010 Africa Cup of Nations players
AS Dragons FC de l'Ouémé players
Enyimba F.C. players
En Avant Guingamp players
Nîmes Olympique players
Paris FC players
Ligue 2 players
Championnat National players
Étoile Sportive du Sahel players
Beninese expatriate footballers
Beninese expatriate sportspeople in Nigeria
Expatriate footballers in Nigeria
Beninese expatriate sportspeople in France
Expatriate footballers in France